The Stellar Banner was an ore carrier, VLOC owned by the South Korean company Polaris Shipping. On February 24, 2020, the vessel declared itself in trouble off Maranhao, Brazil and voluntarily ran aground to avoid sinking.

On June 12, 2020, the Stellar Banner was scuttled by decision of the owner Polaris Shipping. It took 20 minutes to sink, and the funnel detached from the ships superstructure and resurfaced for approximately a minute before also sinking as seen in videos posted on the web.

Investigation 
On 26 October 2021, the Maritime Administrator Marshall Islands published the casualty investigation report.  The report concluded that the most significant cause of the accident was a deviation from the planned route when transiting the Baía de São Marcos, and pointed also to deficiencies in on-board management and in the information available on nautical charts.

References

External links 
 Marshall Islands Investigation Report

Ships built by Hyundai Heavy Industries Group
2016 ships